Anadevidia hebetata is a moth of the family Noctuidae. It is found in Asia, including Japan and India.

The wingspan is 38–45 mm.

External links
Japanese moths

Plusiinae
Moths of Asia
Moths described in 1889